Batogowo  is a village in the administrative district of Gmina Sypniewo, within Maków County, Masovian Voivodeship, in east-central Poland.

Monuments 
 Wayside shrine of 19th century.

References

Batogowo